Herreshoff is a German surname. For the Herreshoff line from Bristol, Rhode Island, the surname is pronounced her-res-hoff, with no stressed syllable.

Herreshoff family (the below are all related)

<li> Charles Frederick Herreshoff (1809–1888)
<li> James Brown F. Herreshoff (1834–1930), American inventor and chemist, son
<li> Charles Frederick Herreshoff (1880–1954), American automobile designer and manufacturer, son

<li> Nathanael Greene Herreshoff (1848–1938), American boat designer, son
<li> Algernon Sidney DeWolf Herreshoff (1886–1977), MIT class of 1911, naval architect, son
<li> Halsey Chase Herreshoff (born 1933), son
<li> Lewis Francis Herreshoff (1890–1972), American boat designer, son

<li> John Brown Francis Herreshoff (1850–1932), American metallurgical chemist, son
<li> Louise Herreshoff (1876–1967), American painter, daughter
<li> Fred Herreshoff (1888–1920), national class American amateur golfer, son

Reference

German-language surnames